Adam Leonard may refer to:

 Adam Leonard (singer-songwriter), English singer-songwriter
 Adam Leonard (gridiron football) (born 1986), American gridiron football linebacker